This is a list of football clubs in Indonesia. Currently the governing body of football in Indonesia is the PSSI.

In Indonesia, there is only one women's football league: the Liga 1 Putri. Thus, there are no promotions or relegation to date.

Liga 1 Putri

Current Teams 
The following clubs are in the Liga 1 Putri for the 2019 season.

See also
 List of football clubs in Indonesia
 Indonesia national football team
 Indonesian football league system

References

 
Women's football clubs
Indonesia women
Football clubs, women's